Tudozersky Pogost is a rural locality (a village) in Andomskoye Rural Settlement, Vytegorsky District, Vologda Oblast, Russia. The population was 171 as of 2002.  There are 4 streets.

Geography 
Tudozersky Pogost is located 15 km northeast of Vytegra (the district's administrative centre) by road. Kalinovskaya is the nearest rural locality.

References 

Rural localities in Vytegorsky District